Crazy Love is a 1987 film directed by Belgian director Dominique Deruddere.  The film is based on various writings by author and poet Charles Bukowski, in particular The Copulating Mermaid of Venice, California, which contains necrophilia.

It was the first Flemish-Belgian film to receive a theatrical release in North America.

Plot

The film follows Harry Voss during three important days of his life. The first is as a youth, the second on the day of his high school graduation and the third as a lonely, middle-aged  man.

The phases of his life show the destruction of hope and innocence and his descent into cynicism, alcoholism and hopelessness.  Idealizing romantic love with a beautiful girl in his childhood, he is bitterly disappointed when the real world does not match the idealized images of love in his own imaginings.  He then discovers as a teenager his peers consider him an outcast due to his chronic and physically disfiguring cystic acne, which covers his face, chest, shoulders and back in weeping pus-filled sores and repulses all who see him.  He turns to alcohol to kill the pain and disappointment, losing all hope of finding true love, only to end up destitute, as an alcoholic in later adulthood.  Only through a freak chance encounter late in his life is he transported back to his innocent memories of childhood and the idealized love of a beautiful girl that he craved in his youth.  Finally fulfilled, he dies by wading out into the open ocean after finding his only "true" love - a "crazy love".  The irony of the "hollowness" of this lost, idealized, love, and the tragic significance Harry places on this single event, sums up his lost life and finally makes him the hero of his own story.

Each of the three phases filmed involves a sexual encounter with a "passive" female.  In the first phase, the child is pushed into a sexual encounter with a friend's attractive mother whilst she is sleeping, drunk, in her bed at home.  In the second, a girl lies passively in the back seat of a car, uninterested, whilst he attempts to have sex with her.  She does it only as a favor to her boyfriend who is friends with Harry, but cannot carry through in the end and turns away in disgust at his appalling cystic acne.  In the third, as an older alcoholic, he and his drunk friend stumble upon a fresh corpse and "steal" it as a joke, only for Harry to find that the dead - but still warm - girl resembles the girl of his childhood dreams.

The next morning his friend finds Harry has committed suicide by intentionally walking out to sea with the corpse in his arms, apparently committing suicide after consummating his final desire.

Cast 

Josse De Pauw       
 Michael Pas     
 Amid Chakir     
 Geert Hunaerts  
 Gene Bervoets  
 Florence Beliard

Controversy 

When it was first released, first time director Dominique Deruddere's film divided critics and audiences. Some reviewers noted the quality of the photography and set design and acting.  Others focused on the unacceptable nature of the film's subject.

On its American release, the film was championed by Madonna, Sean Penn and Francis Ford Coppola. Ultimately it proved too controversial for mass acceptance, and never received wide recognition.

It is now considered by some to be one of the classic films of world cinema from the 1980s.

External links

 Crazy Love at Rotten Tomatoes

1987 films
Films based on works by Charles Bukowski
Belgian drama films
Belgian coming-of-age films
1980s Dutch-language films
Necrophilia in film
Films set in Belgium
Films shot in Belgium
1980s Italian-language films
1987 drama films
Films directed by Dominique Deruddere
1987 directorial debut films